The Men's 4 × 100 metre freestyle relay competition of the 2014 FINA World Swimming Championships (25 m) was held on 3 December.

Records
Prior to the competition, the existing world and championship records were as follows.

The following records were established during the competition:

Results

Heats
The heats were held at 12:36.

Final
The final was held at 19:17.

References

Men's 4 x 100 metre freestyle relay